The 1979 All-Big Ten Conference football team consists of American football players chosen by various organizations for All-Big Ten Conference teams for the 1979 Big Ten Conference football season.

Offensive selections

Quarterbacks
 Art Schlichter, Ohio State (AP-1, UPI-1)
 Mark Herrmann, Purdue (AP-2)

Running backs
 Dennis Mosley, Iowa (AP-1, UPI-1)
 Butch Woolfolk, Michigan (AP-1, UPI-1)
 Dave Mohapp, Ohio State (UPI-1 [fullback])

Split ends
 Elmer Bailey, Minnesota (AP-1)

Flankers
 Doug Donley, Ohio State (AP-1; UPI-1)

Tight ends
 Dave Young, Purdue (AP-1)
 Mark Brammer, Michigan State (UPI-1)

Centers
 Jay Hilgenberg, Iowa (AP-1)
 Tom Waugh, Ohio State (UPI-1)

Guards
 Ken Fritz, Ohio State (AP-1, UPI-1)
 Dale Schwan, Purdue (AP-1)
 John Arbeznik, Michigan (UPI-1)

Tackles
 Steve McKenzie, Purdue (AP-1, UPI-1)
 Ray Snell, Wisconsin (AP-1, UPI-1)

Defensive selections

Defensive linemen
 Curtis Greer, Michigan (AP-1, UPI-1)
 Ken Loushin, Purdue (AP-1, UPI-1)
 Keena Turner, Purdue (AP-1)
 Luther Henson, Ohio State (UPI-1)
 Calvin Clark, Purdue (AP-1)
 Jim Laughlin, Ohio State (AP-1, UPI-1 [linebacker[)
 Mike Trgovac, Michigan (UPI-1)

Linebackers
 Ron Simpkins, Michigan (AP-1, UPI-1)
 Dan Bass, Michigan State (AP-1, UPI-1)
 Leven Weiss, Iowa (AP-1)

Defensive backs
 Mike Guess, Ohio State (AP-1, UPI-1)
 Mike Jolly, Michigan (AP-1, UPI-1)
 Tim Wilbur, Indiana (AP-1)
 Todd Bell, Ohio State (UPI-1)
 Vince Skillings, Ohio State (UPI-1)

Special teams

Placekicker
 Vlade Janakievski, Ohio State (AP-1, UPI-1)

Punter
 Ray Stachowicz, Michigan State (AP-1, UPI-1)

Key
AP = Associated Press

See also
1979 College Football All-America Team

References

All-Big Ten Conference
All-Big Ten Conference football teams